Transport in Syria is possible by rail, road, air or rivers, both public and private. Syria is a developed Asian country with a well-developed rail network (2,052 km) and a highway system (782 km). Main international airport is the Damascus International Airport in the capital, Damascus.

Railways 
 
total:
2,052 km
standard gauge:
1,801 km of  gauge
narrow gauge:
251 km of  gauge (2006)

See also Hejaz railway.

Railway links with adjacent countries 
  Turkey - yes, at Qamishli/Nusaybin, 
  Israel - defunct
  Iraq - yes, at Al-Yarubiyah/Rabiya, 
  Jordan - yes -  - in 2005, work commenced to build a  line
  Lebanon - defunct

Developments 
 2008 - proposed joint rolling stock factory with Turkey at Aleppo
 On 22 April 2005 Syria ratified the Agreement on International Railways in the Arab Mashriq, which provides for the implementation of a variety of north–south and east–west links between the states of the region, including the restoration of direct rail links between Syria and Lebanon and Iraq.
 On 7 July 2005 the Syrian General Establishment for the Hejaz Railway announced that it had signed a contract worth US$54 million with a Lebanese company to build a railroad between Damascus and Damascus International Airport.

External links
CFS

Road transport 
An overland trans-desert bus service between Beirut, Haifa, Damascus and Baghdad was established by the Nairn Transport Company of Damascus in 1923.

Roads 

total:
68,157 km
paved:
61,514 km (including 1,103 km of expressways)
unpaved:
6,643 km (2006)

Motorways

Syria has a well-developed system of motorways in the western half of the country. The eastern part nevertheless has only connection through two lanes roads due to the sparsity of the population. The main motorways in Syria are the following:

M1 - Runs from Homs to Latakia. It also connects Tartus, Baniyas and Jableh. Its length is 174 km.
M2 - Runs from Damascus to Jdeidat Yabous, on the border with Lebanon. It also connects Al-Sabboura. Its length is 38 km.
M4 - Runs from Latakia to Saraqib. It also connects Arihah and Jisr al-Shughur. Its length is 120 km. Assuming that it shares some 60 km with the Motorway M5, it arrives until Aleppo, and from there, it has been expanded as a two-lane expressway that continues further east into the Iraqi border, ultimately reaching its destination at Mosul.
M5 - This is the most important motorway in the country, due to its length and as it functions as the south-north backbone of the country network. It connects the border with Jordan in the south with Damascus, the capital, and continues further north to Aleppo, the country's second largest city.
M20 - Also known as Desert Highway. Runs from Tadmur to Deir ez-Zor, it also connects Al-Sukhnah.

Waterways 
900 km; minimal economic importance

Pipelines 
crude oil 1,997 km; petroleum products 3,161 km (2010)

Ports and harbors 
Main international seaport at Latakia with additional ports at Baniyas, Jablah, and Tartus.

Merchant marine 
total:
19 ships ( or over) totaling /
ships by type:
bulk carrier 4, cargo ship 14, carrier 1 (2010)

Airports 

As of 2012, Syria had a total of 99 airports. The major airports are: Aleppo International Airport, Bassel Al-Assad International Airport, Damascus International Airport, Deir ez-Zor Airport, Kamishly Airport, and Palmyra Airport.

Airports (with paved runways)
total: 29
over 3,047 meters in length: 5
2,438 to 3,047 meters: 16
914 to 1,523 meters: 3
under 914 meters: 5

Airports (with unpaved runways)
total:
70
1,524 to 2,437 m:
1
914 to 1,523 m:
14
under 914 m:
55 (2012)

See also 

 Syria

References

External links